Stephen Christopher Spagnuolo (born December 21, 1959) is an American football coach who is the defensive coordinator for the Kansas City Chiefs of the National Football League (NFL). He rejoined Andy Reid after being a defensive assistant with him from 1999 to 2006. Spagnuolo has won three Super Bowls as defensive coordinator, one with the New York Giants and two with the Kansas City Chiefs, making him the only coordinator (offense or defense) in NFL history to win a Super Bowl with two different franchises.

Following two seasons in New York, he was the head coach of the St. Louis Rams for three seasons, was an assistant with the Baltimore Ravens, had a one-season stint with the New Orleans Saints, and then returned to the Giants as defensive coordinator in 2015. He was named interim head coach after the firing of former head coach Ben McAdoo on December 4, 2017.

Spagnuolo has also worked as a college football assistant coach for the University of Connecticut, the University of Maine, Lafayette College, Rutgers University, Bowling Green University, and the University of Massachusetts Amherst. He also spent time in the original World League of American Football and its successor, NFL Europe.

Early years
Born in the Whitinsville section of Northbridge, Massachusetts, Spagnuolo moved to Grafton as a youth. After graduating from Grafton (MA) High School, Spagnuolo played wide receiver at Springfield College. He assisted the University of Massachusetts football team while pursuing his graduate degree.

Coaching career

Philadelphia Eagles
Spagnuolo began his NFL coaching career in the Philadelphia Eagles organization in 1999, serving as linebackers and defensive backs coach. He remained there for eight years.

New York Giants
In January 2007, he was hired as the defensive coordinator for the New York Giants under head coach Tom Coughlin.

He spent two years in New York, and was the architect of the aggressive defensive strategy against the New England Patriots (the highest scoring offensive team in NFL history at the time) in Super Bowl XLII, which was instrumental in the close victory by the Giants. Following the Super Bowl win and a great deal of praise, Spagnuolo's name was widely circulated for open head coach positions around the NFL.

On February 7, 2008, he took his name out of consideration for the head coaching position of the Washington Redskins. The same day, the Giants made Spagnuolo one of the highest-paid defensive coordinators in the NFL with a new three-year contract, worth roughly $2 million a year.

St. Louis Rams
Following another successful season in 2008 in which the Giants finished the season 12–4, but lost in the Divisional round of the NFL Playoffs, Spagnuolo's name came up as a replacement for numerous head-coaching vacancies. These vacancies included, the Denver Broncos, New York Jets, and Detroit Lions,, but Spagnuolo decided to join with the St. Louis Rams, taking over their head-coaching vacancy with a 4-year, $11.5 million contract. Spagnuolo hired Pat Shurmur and Ken Flajole to be the Rams' offensive and defensive coordinators respectively. Spagnuolo then hired Josh McDaniels to be the team's offensive coordinator to replace Shurmur, who left for the Browns' head-coaching job.

Spagnuolo's first season saw the Rams go 1–15, the worst record in the league and the worst season in franchise history. After rebounding to 7–9 in 2010, they regressed to 2–14 in 2011, tied with the Indianapolis Colts with the worst record in the league. Spagnuolo was fired on January 2, 2012, after compiling a 10–38 overall record in his three seasons in St. Louis, the second-lowest winning percentage for a non-interim coach in franchise history.

New Orleans Saints
On January 19, 2012, Spagnuolo agreed to terms with the New Orleans Saints to become the new defensive coordinator under head coach Sean Payton, choosing this position rather than an offer from the Philadelphia Eagles. However, Payton was subsequently suspended for the season for his alleged role in the New Orleans Saints bounty scandal, leaving Spagnuolo to coach the defense without Payton's input.  In 2012, the Saints allowed the most yards for a season of any defense in NFL history en route to finishing 7–9 and missing the playoffs for the first time in four years. Soon after Payton's suspension ended, Spagnuolo was fired on January 24, 2013.

Baltimore Ravens
Baltimore hired Spagnuolo as a senior defensive assistant before the 2013 season, then promoted him to assistant head coach/secondary coach in 2014.

Return to Giants
On January 15, 2015, Spagnuolo rejoined the New York Giants as defensive coordinator, serving under head coach Tom Coughlin in 2015 and then under head coach Ben McAdoo in 2016. The Giants finished 32nd in the NFL in yards allowed his first year back.  They also allowed the most passing yards in NFL history (4,783) and the 2nd most points in NFL history (442). But, the defense rebounded to have the league's 10th best defense in 2016, which fueled the team to an 11-5 record. Spagnuolo became interim head coach of the Giants after a house cleaning by the organization after the firings of McAdoo and General Manager Jerry Reese on December 4, 2017. He led them to a last-game win against the Washington Redskins, but finished 1-3 as interim head coach. After the season, Spagnuolo was not retained by new head coach Pat Shurmur, as Shurmur elected to hire James Bettcher as his defensive coordinator.

Kansas City Chiefs
On January 24, 2019, Spagnuolo was named defensive coordinator for the Kansas City Chiefs. Spagnuolo previously coached defensive backs and linebackers under Chiefs coach Andy Reid in Philadelphia from 1999 to 2006. On February 2, 2020, Spagnuolo appeared in his 3rd Super Bowl, and won his second title as the Chiefs beat the 49ers 31-20 in Super Bowl LIV. On February 12, 2023, Spagnuolo appeared in his 5th Super Bowl and won his third title as the Chiefs beat the Eagles 38-35.

Coaching philosophy
Spagnuolo learned under Philadelphia defensive coach Jim Johnson, and shares the same aggressive, blitz-heavy approach as his mentor. (He did not incorporate this philosophy during his time in New Orleans however.) Spagnuolo uses a 4–3 base defense with a heavy emphasis on multiple blitz packages, including corner and safety blitzes. While defensive coordinator of the New York Giants, he often used a smaller defensive line, with three or even four defensive ends to further pressure the quarterback.

This philosophy proved successful, with the Giants leading the NFL in sacks in 2007. In Super Bowl XLII, Spagnuolo's defense sacked Tom Brady five times, which was the most he had been sacked in any game that season.

Head coaching record

*Interim head coach

Personal life
Spagnuolo is a Christian. He is married to Maria Spagnuolo.

References

External links
 New York Giants profile

1959 births
Living people
American people of Italian descent
Baltimore Ravens coaches
Barcelona Dragons coaches
Bowling Green Falcons football coaches
Coaches of American football from Massachusetts
Frankfurt Galaxy coaches
Kansas City Chiefs coaches
Lafayette Leopards football coaches
Maine Black Bears football coaches
National Football League defensive coordinators
New Orleans Saints coaches
New York Giants coaches
New York Giants head coaches
People from Grafton, Massachusetts
People from Northbridge, Massachusetts
Philadelphia Eagles coaches
Players of American football from Massachusetts
Rutgers Scarlet Knights football coaches
St. Louis Rams head coaches
Sportspeople from Worcester County, Massachusetts
Springfield Pride football players
UConn Huskies football coaches
UMass Minutemen football coaches